Saltwater Creek may refer to the following:

Australia

Saltwater Creek (Gold Coast), Queensland
Saltwater Creek (Moreton Bay Region), Queensland
Saltwater River, Tasmania; also known as Saltwater Creek

New Zealand
Saltwater Creek, New Zealand, a locality in Waimakariri District
Ōhinetamatea River / Saltwater Creek, a river on the West Coast